Damir Šutevski (28 September 1954 – 29 October 2020) was an association football player from Yugoslavia who played for Canadian and American clubs.

Career
Šutevski came from Zagreb, at the time in Yugoslavia, and originally played in the National Soccer League with Toronto Croatia in 1974. He played in the NASL between 1975 and 1982 for the Toronto Metros-Croatia, Rochester Lancers and Montreal Manic.  In 1978, he signed with the New York Arrows of the Major Indoor Soccer League, and played three seasons with them. 
In 1982, he moved to the Phoenix Inferno for two seasons.  He then spent the 1984–1985 season with the Phoenix Pride before finishing his career with one season with the Las Vegas Americans during 1984 and 1985.

References

External links
 NASL/MISL career stats

1954 births
2020 deaths
Footballers from Zagreb
Association football defenders
Yugoslav footballers
Las Vegas Americans players
Montreal Manic players
New York Arrows players
Phoenix Inferno players
Phoenix Pride players
Rochester Lancers (1967–1980) players
Toronto Blizzard (1971–1984) players
Toronto Croatia players
Canadian National Soccer League players
Major Indoor Soccer League (1978–1992) players
North American Soccer League (1968–1984) players
North American Soccer League (1968–1984) indoor players
Yugoslav expatriate footballers
Expatriate soccer players in Canada
Expatriate soccer players in the United States
Yugoslav expatriate sportspeople in Canada
Yugoslav expatriate sportspeople in the United States